Binjamin Wolf Segel (1867–1931) was an author known for his monograph, Welt-Krieg, Welt-Revolution, Welt-Verschwörung, Welt-Oberregierung, 1926, consisting of a scholarly analysis and expose of the Protocols of Zion. This text was subsequently translated into English, edited, and published by Richard S. Levy.

External links

 Digitized works by Binjamin W. Segel at the Leo Baeck Institute, New York

Further reading
Caesar Seligmann: Erinnerungen.  Herausgegeben von Erwin Seligmann, Frankfurt am Main 1975, 172–173 (Segel's biography).
Richard S. Levy: A Lie and a Libel, The History of the Elders of Zion (Lincoln and London: University of Nebraska Press, 1995)
Binjamin W. Segel: Welt-Krieg, Welt-Revolution, Welt-Verschwörung, Welt-Oberregierung (Berlin: Philo Verlag, 1926)

1867 births
1931 deaths
20th-century German writers